This is a list of all the United States Supreme Court cases from volume 546 of the United States Reports:

External links

2005 in United States case law
2006 in United States case law